Southern Charm Savannah (abbreviated as Southern Charm Sav) is an American reality television series that premiered on Bravo on May 8, 2017. Developed as the first spin-off of Southern Charm, it aired two seasons.

The series chronicles the personal and professional lives of several socialites who reside in Savannah, Georgia.

Production 
On October 27, 2016 Bravo announced that it would be producing a spin-off series of Southern Charm, titled Southern Charm Savannah. The show premiered on May 8, 2017. The first season finale aired on June 26, 2017.

In 2018, it was announced that the show's second season would premiere in July. The season finale aired on September 3, 2018.

Cast members
Main
 Catherine Cooper (Season 1-2)
 Daniel Eichholz (Season 1-2)
 Hannah Pearson (Season 1-2)
 Louis Oswald (Season 1-2)
 Lyle Mackenzie (Season 1-2)
 Ashley Borders (Main Season 1) (Guest Season 2)
 Hagood Coxe (Season 2)
Recurring
 Happy McCullough (Season 1)
 Nelson Lewis (Season 1)
 Brandon Branch (Guest Season 1) (Recurring season 2)

Episodes

Series overview

Season 1 (2017)

Season 2 (2018)

References 

Bravo (American TV network) original programming
2010s American reality television series
2017 American television series debuts
Television shows set in Savannah, Georgia